Judo has been an event at the East Asian Games since 1993 in Shanghai, China.

List Tournaments

Medal table

References

 
Asian Games, East
Sports at the East Asian Games
Games, East
Asian Games, East